Venoge may refer to:
Venoge (river), river in Switzerland
La Venoge (poem)
De Venoge, champagne producer